Scaptius ignivena is a moth in the family Erebidae. It was described by James John Joicey and George Talbot in 1917. It is found in Peru.

References

Moths described in 1917
Phaegopterina